Lužec nad Vltavou is a municipality and village in Mělník District in the Central Bohemian Region of the Czech Republic. It has about 1,400 inhabitants.

Administrative parts
The village of Chramostek is an administrative part of Lužec nad Vltavou.

Notable people
Miloš Jiránek (1875–1911), painter, art critic and writer

References

Villages in Mělník District